St. Elizabeth Hospital, officially Ascension Northeast Wisconsin St. Elizabeth Hospital, is a hospital founded in 1899 that serves the south side of Appleton, in Outagamie County, Wisconsin. Its emergency department is a level III trauma center.

History 
St. Elizabeth Hospital was founded at the behest of Bishop Sebastian Gebhard Messmer of Green Bay. Four women from the Franciscan Sisters of the Sacred Hearts of Jesus and Mary in St. Louis came to Appleton. The hospital the four women founded began in 1899 in an 11-room wooden house. It quickly outgrew that location. New land was purchased and a larger brick building on that site constructed in 1900.

In January 2022, ThedaCare Regional Medical Center–Appleton was granted a temporary injunction against St. Elizabeth and Ascension after it hired seven of the 11 members of Theda's stroke care team who had applied to St. Elizabeth and been offered better pay and hours. Theda had declined to make matching offers, saying that it could not afford to. It sought instead a 90-day period before all the workers could take their news jobs; otherwise, Theda warned, stroke care in the Fox Valley, where it is the only Level II accredited facility, could suffer in the interim and patients might have to go outside the region.

Affiliations 
St. Elizabeth Hospital associated with Oshkosh's Mercy Medical Center in 1995 to form the Affinity Health System, which later incorporated Calumet Medical Center in 1998.

The hospitals and clinics of Affinity Health System were absorbed by and began using the Ascension name beginning September 20, 2016.

References 

Buildings and structures in Appleton, Wisconsin
Hospitals in Wisconsin
Hospitals established in 1899